Alfred Hitchcock (1899–1980) was an English director and filmmaker. Popularly known as the "Master of Suspense" for his use of innovative film techniques in thrillers, Hitchcock started his career in the British film industry as a title designer and art director for a number of silent films during the early 1920s. His directorial debut was the 1925 release The Pleasure Garden. Hitchcock followed this with The Lodger: A Story of the London Fog, his first commercial and critical success. It featured many of the thematic elements his films would be known for, such as an innocent man on the run. It also featured the first of his famous cameo appearances. Two years later he directed Blackmail (1929) which was his first sound film. In 1935, Hitchcock directed The 39 Steps; three years later, he directed The Lady Vanishes, starring Margaret Lockwood and Michael Redgrave.

In 1940, Hitchcock transitioned to Hollywood productions, the first of which was the psychological thriller Rebecca, starring Laurence Olivier and Joan Fontaine. He received his first nomination for the Academy Award for Best Director, and the film won Best Picture. Hitchcock worked with Fontaine again the following year on the film Suspicion, which also starred Cary Grant. In 1943, Hitchcock directed another psychological thriller Shadow of a Doubt, which starred Teresa Wright and Joseph Cotten. Three years later, he reunited with Grant on Notorious, which also starred Ingrid Bergman. The film included a three-minute intermittent kissing scene between the leads shot specifically to skirt the Motion Picture Production Code which at the time limited such scenes to three seconds. In 1948, Hitchcock directed Rope, which starred James Stewart. The film was his first in Technicolor and is remembered for its use of long takes to make the film appear to be a single continuous shot. Three years later, he directed Strangers on a Train (1951).

Hitchcock collaborated with Grace Kelly on three films: Dial M for Murder (1954), Rear Window (1954) and To Catch a Thief (1955). For Rear Window, Hitchcock received a nomination for Best Director at the Academy Awards. 1955 marked his debut on television as the host of the anthology television series Alfred Hitchcock Presents, which he also produced. In 1958, Hitchcock directed the psychological thriller Vertigo, starring Stewart and Kim Novak. The film topped the 2012 poll of the British film magazine Sight & Sound of the 50 Greatest Films of All Time and also topped the American Film Institute's Top Ten in the mystery genre. He followed this with the spy thriller North by Northwest (1959), which starred Grant and Eva Marie Saint. In 1960, he directed Psycho, the biggest commercial success of his career and for which he received his fifth nomination for Best Director at the Academy Awards. Three years later, he directed the horror film The Birds, starring Tippi Hedren. The following year, he reunited with Hedren on Marnie, which also starred Sean Connery.

In recognition of his career, Hitchcock garnered the British Academy of Film and Television Arts (BAFTA) Fellowship Award, the American Film Institute's Life Achievement Award, the Irving G. Thalberg Memorial Award, the Directors Guild of America's Lifetime Achievement Award and the Golden Globe Cecil B. DeMille Award. He received two stars on the Hollywood Walk of Fame to acknowledge his film and television achievements. In 1980, Hitchcock received a knighthood.

Film

As director

Other work

Television

See also 
 List of unproduced Hitchcock projects
 List of awards and nominations received by Alfred Hitchcock

References

External links 

 

Filmography
Director filmographies
 
British filmographies
American filmographies